Sub Noize Souljaz is a mixtape by Suburban Noize Records released on February 15, 2005. Sub Noize Souljaz is a fifteen track collaboration unifying the whole Sub Noize label in many combinations. Sub Noize head group the Kottonmouth Kings join with label mates Big B, Judge D, Saint Dog, and more including newcomers Dirtball, and Chucky Styles who make their impressive debut. This CD contains tracks with Saint Dog, Richter, D-Loc, and Brad X performing together for the first time since 1999 when Saint Dog parted ways with the Kottonmouth Kings. This challenges of an album demonstrated the unique bond that is the "Subnoize Family".

Track listing

References 

Suburban Noize Records albums
2005 mixtape albums